A healthcare system is a set of activities with a common set of objectives. For each objective it is necessary to choose one, or more, criteria that can be used to measure progress or the lack of it. The dataset of criteria provides another of the essential elements of a system – the feedback loop.

Examples of the uses of the term system relevant to healthcare 

“ The concept of a production system as a socio-technical system designates a general field of study concerned with the interrelations of the technical and socio-psychological organization of industrial production systems. … The concept of a socio-technical system arose from the consideration that any production system requires both a technological organization – equipment and process layout – and a work organization relating to each other those who carry out the necessary tasks. The technological demands place limits on the type of work organization possible, but a work organization has social and psychological properties of its own that are independent of technology….. A socio-technical system must also satisfy the financial conditions of the industry of which it is a part. It must have economic validity. It has in fact social, technological and economic dimensions, all of which are interdependent but all of which have independent values of their own.’ ”   (Rice:  Productivity and Social Organization.)
Source:  Trist, E.L., Higgin, G.W., Murray, H., Pollock, A.B. (1963)   Organizational Choice. Capabilities of groups at the coal face under changing technologies. The loss, re-discovery and transformation of a work tradition. Tavistock Publications. Tavistock Institute of Human Relations, (p.6).

“What distinguishes systems is that it is a subject which can talk about the other subjects. It is not a discipline to be put in the same set as the others, it is a meta-discipline whose subject matter can be applied within virtually any other discipline.”
Source:  Checkland, P. (1993)   Systems Thinking, Systems Practice. John Wiley & Sons, Chichester.  (p. 5).

“The systems paradigm is concerned with wholes and their properties. It is holistic, but not in the usual (vulgar) sense of taking in the whole;  systems concepts are concerned with wholes and their hierarchical arrangement rather than with the whole.”
Source:  Checkland, P. (1993)   Systems Thinking, Systems Practice. John Wiley & Sons, Chichester.  (p. 13-14).

“Set of interdependent elements interacting to achieve a common aim. These elements may be both human and nonhuman (equipment, technologies, etc.).”
Source:  Kohn, L.T., Corrigan, J.M., Donaldson, M.S. (Eds).  Committee on Quality of Health Care in America, Institute of Medicine.  (2000)   To Err is Human.  Building a Safer Health System. National Academy Press, Washington.  (p. 211)

“A system is defined as a network of interdependent components that work together to try to accomplish a specific aim.”
Source:  Nelson, E.C., Batalden, P.B., Godfrey, M.M. (2007)   Quality by Design. A Clinical Microsystems Approach. John Wiley & Sons Inc. (p. 230)

“A system is an integrated series of parts with a clearly defined goal.”
Source: Dennis, P. (2007)   Lean Production Simplified. A plan language guide to the world’s most powerful production system. Productivity Press, New York.  (p. 15).

“Webster’s New Collegiate Dictionary defines a system as ‘an assemblage of objects united by some form of regular interaction of interdependence’. Like the solar system, the nervous system or the operating system of your computer, this is the sense in which I use the word ‘system’ in this book.”
Source:  Lovelock, J. (2009)   The Vanishing Face of Gaia.  A final warning. Allen Lane, Penguin (p. 168)

Setting of Objectives 

The setting of objectives and the choice of criteria relating to the healthcare provided for a condition such as Parkinson Disease or Renal Failure has a number of benefits, notably

•	It allows a patient to compare the performance of that aspect of healthcare that is of most importance to them 
•	It allows those who allocate resources to judge the value that would be added if additional resources were to be invested in that system, at the expense of systems focussed on other health problems.

It is necessary to have closed systems like hospitals and primary care services to employ staff and ensure money is administered with probity but they are all parts of an open system of healthcare and changes imposed in any one closed system will have unintended consequences elsewhere through a feedback mechanism that may, or may not, be predictable. Traditional approaches have sought to manage health problems by tighter control of organisations which cover a wide range of health problems, hospitals and community care for example with patients being referred to the former and discharged to the latter. This two-box approach has many weaknesses, implying, for example, that a hospital is not a community service. Another approach is to present different levels of care in the form of a Venn diagram.
 
For serious, acute problems, a fractured femur for example the spectrum of the relative contributions of the different sectors of care, are consistent from between countries and within a country. Self care is minimal, primary care by an ambulance service brief, and most care is provided in secondary care, with tertiary care being needed for the person who has multiple injuries in addition to the fractured femur and needs the services of a trauma center. For chronic conditions, however the distribution of care is often sub optimal because the indications for moving from one level of care to another are often unclear and may be influenced by emotional and, apparently, irrational factors. 
Even if the number of patients in each part of the spectrum is correct there will be some

•	Receiving care that is more intensive than they need
•	Receiving care that is less intensive that they need

Both groups reduce the value derived from the resources invested

Health care management